South Africa (known as the Springboks) are a Rugby Union National Team that played their first international match in 1891.

The records listed below only include performances in Test matches. The top five are listed in each category (except when there is a tie for the last place among the five, when all the tied record holders are noted).

Team records

Individual records

Most caps

Most points

Most tries

Most appearances as captain

Match records

References

South Africa
South Africa national rugby union team lists